Svend Langkjær (23 August 1886 – 2 May 1948) was a Danish track and field athlete who competed in the 1908 and 1912 Summer Olympics. In 1908 he competed in both the standing high jump and the standing long jump, finishing eighth in the high jump with a height of 1.42. In 1912 he competed in the decathlon. He did not finish, after failing to start the high jump, the fourth of the ten events.

See also 
 Denmark at the 1908 Summer Olympics
 Denmark at the 1912 Summer Olympics

References

External links
 

1886 births
1948 deaths
Danish decathletes
Danish high jumpers
Danish long jumpers
Olympic athletes of Denmark
Athletes (track and field) at the 1908 Summer Olympics
Athletes (track and field) at the 1912 Summer Olympics
Olympic decathletes